Lee On Estate is a public housing estate in Wu Kai Sha, Ma On Shan, New Territories, Hong Kong near MTR Wu Kai Sha station. It is the third public housing estate in Ma On Shan. It consists of five residential buildings completed in 1993 and 1994.

Kam Lung Court is a Home Ownership Scheme court in Ma On Shan, near Lee On Estate. It consists of four blocks built in 1993.

Houses

Lee On Estate

Kam Lung Court

Demographics
According to the 2016 by-census, Lee On Estate had a population of 11,159 while Kam Lung Court had a population of 3,712. Altogether the population amounts to 14,871.

Politics
For the 2019 District Council election, the estate fell within two constituencies. Lee On Estate is located in the Lee On constituency, which is represented by Chris Mak Yun-pui, while Kam Lung Court falls within the Fu Lung constituency, which is represented by Yen Tsang So-lai.

COVID-19 pandemic
Lee Shing House was placed under lockdown on 13 February, 2022.

See also

Public housing estates in Ma On Shan

References

Residential buildings completed in 1993
Residential buildings completed in 1994
Ma On Shan
Public housing estates in Hong Kong
1993 establishments in Hong Kong
1994 establishments in Hong Kong